Kotido District is a district in Northern Uganda. It is named after its 'chief town', Kotido, where the district headquarters are located.

Location
Kotido District is bordered by Kaabong District to the north, Moroto District to the east, Napak District to the south and Abim District to the west. Agago District and Kitgum District lie to the northwest of Kotido District. The coordinates of the district are:03 31N, 34 07E.

Overview
The district is part of the Karamoja sub-region, home to an estimated 1.2 million Karimojong, according to the 2002 national census. The sub-region consists of the following districts:
(a) Abim District (b) Amudat District (c) Kaabong District (d) Kotido District (e) Moroto District (f) Nakapiripirit District (g) Napak District (h) Lusot District (i) Karenga District (j) Nabilatuk District

Population
In 1991, the national population census estimated the district population at about 62,340. The national census in 2002 estimated the population of the district at about 129,100. The annual population growth rate in Kotido District, between 2002 and 2012, has been calculated at 6.39%. It is estimated that in 2012, the population of Kotido District was approximately 236,900.

Sub-counties and parishes

Economic activities

Nomadic pastoralism is the main economic activity in the district.

In some areas, peasant agriculture is practiced. The crops grown include the following:

See also

References

External links
Women Want Budget Pledges Fulfilled by Government

 
Karamoja
Districts of Uganda
Northern Region, Uganda